The Imp Prince (known as Le Prince Lutin in French)  is a French fairy tale written by Marie Catherine d'Aulnoy and published in her book Fairy Tales (Les Contes des Fees) in 1697.

The word Lutin, in French, can have several translations and meanings. A lutin was like an imp or hobgoblin in the mythology of Normandy, similar to house-spirits of Germany and Scandinavia. Notably, this story gives a description of the Lutin.

Translations
English publications of this tale translated its name as The Hobgoblin Prince, Prince Sprite, Prince Ariel, Prince Elfin or The Invisible Prince. A German language translation titled the tale Prinz Kobold.

Synopsis

The story is about the life of Léandre, a handsome prince who was a human but turned into a lutin (imp) after the ruling prince forced his retreat from court into the countryside.

There was once a king and queen who had a malformed son named Furibon. He was as large as the largest man and small as smallest dwarf, he had an ugly face and a deformed body and mean spirit, but the queen was insane and thought Furibon was the most beautiful child in the world.  Furibon's governor was a rival prince, who had claims to the throne. This governor brought with him his own son named prince Léandre.

Léandre was very well liked in court, the ladies loved him, thought him very handsome and called him the "beautiful indifferent one" (translated). Furibon, however, was hated. He insulted people and reported their secret faults to the King and Queen.

One day, ambassadors came from afar and seeing Léandre with Furibon together, they bowed to Léandre thinking he was the prince and thinking Furibon was just a dwarf. They teased Furibon and laughed at him. When no one was looking, Furibon angrily took Léandre by the hair and tore out three handfuls. Thus, Léandre's father sent Léandre to live in a castle in the countryside, to be safely far away from Furibon. In the countryside, Léandre was free to hunt, fish, walk, paint, read and play musical instruments. He was happy but lonely. He found an injured grass snake one evening and brought it home to feed and care for it, hoping it would bring him some joy. One day Furibon came into the woods with assassins to hunt Léandre down and kill him. Léandre decided that he must travel the world and get away from the kingdom once and for all.

Before leaving, Léandre visited the room of the grass snake and found out that it had turned into a beautiful jewel-studded fairy named Gentille. She said she took the form of a snake for 8 days every 100 years and could have been killed. Gentille was indebted to Léandre for protecting her life when she was a  grass snake and offered him all sorts of rewards: riches, a long life, a kingdom with houses full of gold, the life of an excellent orator, poet, musician, or painter. Finally she suggested he become an "air, water and terrestrial lutin."  Gentille described the benefits of being a lutin (imp):  "You are invisible when you like it; you cross in one moment the vast space of the universe; you rise without having wings; you go through the ground without dying; you penetrate the abysses of the sea without drowning; you enter everywhere, though the windows and the doors are closed; and, when you decide to, you can let yourself be seen in your natural form."

Léandre agreed to be a lutin. So Gentille said "Be Imp" and passed her hands three times over his eyes and face. Then she gave him a small red hat, trimmed with two parrot feathers, that would  make him invisible when he wore it.

As an imp, Léandre began to travel. First Léandre took revenge on Furibon and the queen, by sneaking unseen into their palace where he nailed Furibon's ear to a door, beat them a thousand times with a rod used on the king's dogs, and tore up all the fruit and flowers in the queen's garden.

Léandre then traveled far away. In one kingdom he fell in love with a maid of honor named Blondine, but learned by putting a magic pink rose on her throat that she was in love with a hateful musician, so left her kingdom heartbroken.

In three separate adventures, Léandre came to the invisible aid of young maidens by cursing and battling with people that were going to harm them: He saved the first maiden from being married to an old man, another from being sacrificed in a temple by her family, and the third a young girl named Abricotine (which translates to "Apricot-plum"), who he found enslaved in the forest by four robbers.

After rescuing Abricotine, Léandre learned she was a fairy who lived on a secluded island that was only for females. An old fairy mother had created this island and retreated from the world because she had been hurt in a love affair and so drove out all the male guards and the officers and replaced them with women from the Amazon race instead. She named this place the Island of Quiet Pleasures. Abricotine served the daughter princess who had inherited the Island.  Léandre asked to see the island, but Abricotine could not allow a man inside. So he went invisibly by himself and saw a palace made of pure gold; crystal figures and precious stones, and “all the wonders of nature, sciences and arts, the elements, the sea and fish, the ground and the animals, hunting of Diane with her nymphs, (and) the noble exercises of the Amazons."

The fairy princess had lived here in seclusion for 600 years, but looked like a young girl of incomparable beauty to him. Léandre pretended to be the voice of the parrots in her house, and told her about a man had saved Abricotine's life, and tried to convince her to give this man (himself) a chance to meet her. The princess appeared interested but suspicious. He stayed invisible a long time in her palace, and listened to her conversations, ate invisibly beside her at her table every night, spoke as the parrot sometimes, and slowly convinced her that she might be able to trust a man. He brought her monkeys and fine clothes from around the world when she mentioned them. The fairy princess could not decide if the invisible presence was good or evil. One day Léandre painted and put a portrait of himself out. She liked it very much, but was afraid it was done by a demon.  Léandre finally wrote her a love note:

Léandre, intending to speak, wrote these words on its shelves and threw them to the feet of the princess:
"No I am not demon nor fairy,
I am an unhappy lover
Who does not dare to appear in your eyes:
Feel sorry for my destiny at least
THE PRINCE LUTIN."

At the same time, Furibon wanted the same princess, and planned to attack the Island of Quiet Pleasures with an army of 1400 men in order to break in and take her. Léandre disguised himself as an Amazon woman and went out to buy off Furibon, giving Furibon rooms full of gold if he left without attacking the island. Furibon planned to take the gold, then kill the Amazon and attack the palace anyway but Léandre put on his hat, and then killed and beheaded Furibon. Furibon's army was happy that the evil Furibon had been killed. Léandre became their new and rightful king, and he spread all the gold among them. Léandre took Furibon's head into the palace to show the fairies they were safe.

Much tired, Léandre went back into the palace and fell asleep as if dead, not wearing his invisibility hat. The princess saw him sleeping, and most of her fears were resolved. Her mother, the "old hag" (as translated) who had secluded the island for 600 years, was angry with his appearance and against their marriage.  Léandre's friend Gentille came to his aid and convinced the old fairy to trust Léandre. The marriage festivals were very joyful.

Context

The story notably gives a good description of a Lutin (imp), and mentions three types: air, water and terrestrial lutin. The lutin has no notable physical obstacles.

The storyteller would have known of legends of the Amazons as an ancient nation of female warriors, in this story protecting an all-female society. The mention of Diana on her hunt alludes to the mythology of the Ancient Roman Goddess Diana, huntress goddess, associated with wild animals and woodlands. In this story she lives with the women on the independent island, they pursue art and science.

The period of 600 years of seclusion may have significance as a period in history.

Legacy
The tale was one of many from d'Aulnoy's pen to be adapted to the stage by James Planché, as part of his Fairy Extravaganza. He also translated the tale as Prince Sprite, and retitled it The Invisible Prince, or, The Island of Tranquil Delights when he adapted it to the stage.

References

External links

 The Project Gutenberg EBook of Contes, Tome I, by Marie-Catherine d'Aulnoy - Le Prince Lutin (in French)
 Websters Online Dictionary: Lutin - French

1697 short stories
Works by Madame d'Aulnoy
French legendary creatures
French fairy tales
French folklore
Norman folklore
Works about princes